The International String Quartet Competition "Premio Paolo Borciani" was created in 1987 in Reggio Emilia, Italy, and is dedicated to their famous fellow citizen, founder and first violin of the Quartetto Italiano. The promoter and organiser is Fondazione I Teatri in Reggio Emilia; artistic director is Paolo Cantù; founder was pianist Guido Alberto Borciani, Paolo Borciani’s brother. The competition has been a member of the World Federation of International Music Competitions since 1991.

Competition results

1987
1st Prize: not awarded
2nd Prize: Carmina String Quartet, Switzerland
3rd Prize: not awarded

1990
1st Prize: Keller String Quartet, Hungary
2nd Prize: Lark String Quartet, United States
3rd Prize: ex-aequo Danubius String Quartet, Hungary and Subaru String Quartet, Japan

1994
1st Prize: not awarded
2nd Prize: Mandelring String Quartet, Germany
3rd Prize: not awarded
Special Prize: Mandelring String Quartet, Germany (best performance of the Quartet commissioned to Marco Stroppa)

1997
1st Prize: Artemis String Quartet, Germany
2nd Prize: not awarded
3rd Prize: ex-aequo Auer String Quartet, Hungary and Lotus String Quartet, Japan
Special Prize: Lotus String Quartet, Japan (best performance of the Quartet commissioned to Luciano Berio)

2000
1st Prize: not awarded
2nd Prize: Excelsior String Quartet, Japan
3rd Prize: Casals String Quartet, Spain
Special Prize: Excelsior String Quartet, Japan (best performance of the Quartet commissioned to Salvatore Sciarrino)

2002
1st Prize: Kuss String Quartet, Germany
2nd Prize: Pacifica Quartet, United States
3rd Prize: Auer Quartet, Hungary
Special Prize: Ex-aequo Kuss Quartet and Pacifica Quartet (best performance of the Quartet commissioned to Wolfgang Rihm)

2005
1st Prize: Pavel Haas Quartet, Czech Republic
2nd Prize: Tankstream Quartet, Australia
3rd Prize: Chiara String Quartet, United States
4th Prize: €4,000, offered by Mrs Irene Steels-Wilsing (Brussels) in memory of an unforgettable week Biava Quartet, United States
Special Prize for the best performance of the quartet commissioned to Sir Peter Maxwell Davies: Pavel Haas Quartet, Czech Republic

2008
1st Prize: Bennewitz String Quartet, Czech Republic
2nd Prize: Doric String Quartet, Great Britain
3rd Prize: ex aequo Ardeo String Quartet, France and Signum String Quartet, Germany
Special Prize Irene Steels-Wilsing: Amaryllis String Quartet, Germany/Swtzerland
Special Prize for the best performance of the new quartet commissioned to Giovanni Sollima: Quiroga String Quartet, Spain

2011

1st Prize: not awarded
Finalist Prize: Amaryllis Quartet, Germany; Meccorre Quartet, Poland; Voce Quartet, France
Audience Prize: Voce Quartet, France
Special Prize for the best performance of the new quartet commissioned to Giya Kancheli: ex aequo Meccorre Quartet, Poland and Cavaleri Quartet, UK

2014

1st Prize: Kelemen Quartet, Hungary
2nd Prize: Mucha Quartet, Slovakia
3rd Prize: Varèse Quartet, France
Audience Prize: Mucha Quartet, Slovakia
Special Prize for the best performance of a contemporary piece: Varèse Quartet, France

2017

1st Prize: not awarded 
2nd Prize: Omer Quartet, United States
3rd Prize: Quartetto Adorno, Italy
Audience Prize: Quartetto Adorno, Italy
Special Prize for the best performance of a contemporary piece: Quartetto Adorno, Italy

Honorary Committee
Martha Argerich
Borodin String Quartet
Radu Lupu
Riccardo Muti
Arvo Pärt
Maurizio Pollini
Wolfgang Rihm
Salvatore Sciarrino
Marco Stroppa

See also
 List of classical music competitions
 World Federation of International Music Competitions
 String quartet

External links 
 Fondazione I Teatri di Reggio Emilia; Competition's venue and organizer.

Sources
Premio Borciani 
DIE ZEIT, 26.06.2008 Nr. 27 

Music competitions in Italy